Santos FC, nicknamed "Peixe", is a football club based in Santos, Brazil that competes in the Campeonato Paulista, São Paulo's state league, and the Campeonato Brasileiro Série A, Brazil's national league. Since its founding in 1912, the club has had 35 different presidents. The president has the responsibility for the overall management of the club, including formally signing contracts with players and staff.

List of presidents
Below is the official presidential history of Santos FC, from when Sizino Patuska took over at the club in 1912, until the present day.

Notes

References